The Scottish Junior Football North Division One known as the McBookie.com First Division was the second tier of the North Region of the Scottish Junior Football Association. Clubs at the end of the season would be promoted to the North Superleague. From 2011, the division comprised two West and East sections running in parallel. Two years later the North Division Two, which clubs had previously been relegated into, was abolished as part of this change. From the 2016–17 season, the runners-up in each section played off for the right to meet the third-bottom club in the North Superleague for an extra promotion/relegation spot.

The North region leagues were restructured again for season 2017–18 with the creation of the North First Division and North Second Division (essentially returning to the pre-2011 setup).

Final Members

First Division (West)

Whitehills return to the league from a season in abeyance. Spey Valley United are a new club formed from the merger of Grantown and Spey Valley who finished 7th and 5th respectively in the 2015–16 First Division (West). Two clubs were also moved to the West Division to balance league numbers. This was done according to rule of which club lay furthest West by longitude. The two clubs switched were Newmachar United and Montrose Roselea. Roselea are new members of the North Region having transferred from the East Region in 2016. In September 2016, Fochabers left their facility in the village and relocated to Bishopmill United's old ground in Elgin.

First Division (East)

Stoneywood Parkvale are a new club formed from the merger of F.C. Stoneywood who finished 14th (last) in the 2015–16 North Superleague, and Parkvale, who finished 6th in the First Division (East). Aberdeen University were expelled from the association at the 2016 AGM for non-attendance and non-payment of subscriptions but were re-admitted shortly after.

Past champions
As part of North Junior Football League ('East Section' feeding to Premier Division, single group - in parallel with 'North Section'):

As part of Scottish Junior Football Association, North Region (feeding to Super League - East and West groups):

As part of Scottish Junior Football Association, North Region (feeding to Super League - single group):

As part of Scottish Junior Football Association, North Region (feeding to Super League - East and West groups):

References

External links
North Region Division One at Non-League Scotland (archive version, 2007-08 membership)

2
2003 establishments in Scotland
Sports leagues established in 2003
Sports leagues disestablished in 2018
2018 disestablishments in Scotland